Seongmu Airport  is an airfield which is used by the Korea Air Force Academy for flight training. The airfield has a single runway (16/34).

References

Airports in South Korea
Cheongju